Ukkadam Flyover also known as Ukkadam-Aathupalam flyover is a 2.5 km long flyover under construction in the city of Coimbatore.

Background
The foundation stone for the flyover was laid in 2019. The flyover is designed to ease the traffic congestion caused in Ukkadam and Aathupalam junctions.

Planning
The flyover begins at the western end of Oppanakara Street near the Ukkadam signal and proceeds towards Aathupalam junction via Karumbukadai and will bifurcate into two branches- one on the Pollachi Road and Palakkad Road. The flyover will have an exit and entry ramp on the Sungam bypass road.

See Also
 Flyovers in Coimbatore
 Avinashi Road Expressway, Coimbatore

References

Bridges in Tamil Nadu
Flyovers in Coimbatore